The American Cinematheque is an independent, nonprofit cultural organization in Los Angeles, California, United States dedicated exclusively to the public presentation of the moving image in all its forms.

The Cinematheque was created in 1981 as an offshoot of the annual Filmex Los Angeles Film Festival, which ran every year from 1971 to 1983. After five years of fundraising and planning, the Cinematheque launched its first series of screenings in 1987. It presents festivals and retrospectives that screen the best of worldwide cinema, video, and television from the past and present, ranging from the classics to the outer frontiers of the art form. In addition to presenting and celebrating all aspects of the moving picture on the big screen, the Cinematheque also provides a forum where film lovers and students can learn from world's leading filmmakers, actors, writers, editors, cinematographers, and others about their craft.

The Cinematheque's Theaters

Between 1987 and 1998, the Cinematheque presented its programs at a variety of venues, including the Directors Guild of America theater and the Raleigh Studios complex in Hollywood. In December 1998, it opened its own permanent home at the Egyptian in Hollywood, and in 2004 added a second theater, the Aero Theatre, in Santa Monica. It now presents festivals, retrospectives, and assorted programs at these two theaters.

Grauman's Egyptian Theatre is the Hollywood movie palace built in 1922 by showman Sid Grauman (four years prior to opening his Chinese Theatre). It was the location of Hollywood's first-ever movie premiere in 1922. In 1998, the American Cinematheque completed a major $12.8 million renovation that restored the theater's exterior to its original form, and added new film, video, and audio technology.

The Aero Theatre in Santa Monica is a 1940 landmark movie theater that has also been renovated by the American Cinematheque.

Programming

Film Festivals
The American Cinematheque is home to a number of annual film festivals, which cover diverse topics, genres, and international cinemas. Its annual Beyond Fest, now entering its eighth year, is the highest attended genre film festival in the U.S.

For the last 22 years, the Cinematheque has partnered with the Film Noir Foundation on its longest running festival, Noir City: Hollywood, that celebrates the history of film noir. Nitrate Nights, one of The American Cinematheque's newer film festivals, offers rare chances to see films on 35mm nitrate film base, a format abandoned in the early 1950s due to its highly flammable quality. After being retrofitted to project nitrate safely in 2016, the Cinematheque has since partnered with such film archives as the George Eastman Museum, the Library of Congress, the Academy Film Archive and the UCLA Film and Television Archive to bring rare archival prints to the screen for the public.

The Cinematheque also partners annually with the Hollywood Foreign Press Association to present the Golden Globe Foreign-Language Nominees Series, which includes screenings of the year's nominations for the Golden Globe Award for Best Foreign Language Film. Each year the series has culminated in a panel discussion symposium with the directors of the five nominated films.

Other Notable Film Festivals 

 The All Night Horrorthon at the Aero 
 Recent Spanish Cinema 
 Cinema Italian Style
 German Currents 
 Canada Now
 Starring Europe: New Films from the EU
 Screwball Comedy Festival
 Etheria Film Night Annual Showcase

Past Film Festivals 

 EW's CapeTown Film Festival
 Festival of Fantasy, Horror, and Science Fiction
 Brutal Youth Festival with Entertainment Weekly

It has also presented Mods & Rockers Festival a festival of rock-culture films first presented in 1999.

Other Regular Film Series
The Cinematheque also hosts a number of regular screening series year round including:

 Cinematic Void
 Art Directors Guild Film Society 
 Greg Proops Film Club
 Etheria Monthly Screening Series

American Cinematheque Award
In addition to its year-round programs, the organization presents the prestigious American Cinematheque Award annually to a filmmaker in recognition of contributions to the art form.  In the 20 years since the award's inception, many major filmmakers have been honored, including directors such as Steven Spielberg, Martin Scorsese, Ron Howard, and Rob Reiner, producer Jerry Bruckheimer, and actors including Eddie Murphy, Bette Midler, Mel Gibson, Bruce Willis, Samuel L. Jackson, Denzel Washington, and Jodie Foster.

Former Distribution
American Cinematheque's distribution arm was set up in 1999 as Vitagraph Films.

Participation by industry leaders
The organization is governed by a board of directors and a board of trustees. The two boards include many prominent leaders in the entertainment industry, including directors and producers such as Sydney Pollack, Martin Scorsese, Mike Nichols, Francis Coppola, William Friedkin, Melvin Van Peebles, Brian Grazer, Joe Dante, Paula Wagner, and Steve Tisch. Other prominent board members include actors Candice Bergen and Goldie Hawn; studio chief Mike Medavoy; journalist Peter Bart (editor in chief of Variety); and talent agent Rick Nicita (co-chairman of Creative Artists Agency).

Attorney General's investigation and Proposed sale of the Egyptian Theatre
As of May 2019, the American Cinematheque was under investigation by the California Attorney General. Netflix is reportedly seeking to purchase the theater, but concerned community members are petitioning the American Cinematheque board, the California Attorney General and Los Angeles City Council to halt the sale and hold public meetings explaining the situation.

References

External links
 Official American Cinematheque website
Friends of the American Cinematheque at the Egyptian Theatre petition campaign

Culture of Los Angeles
Film organizations in the United States
Cinema of Southern California
Arts organizations established in 1981
Organizations based in Los Angeles